BMW V12 may refer to:

 Multiple V12 engines built by BMW since 1986, named the M70, M73, N73 or N74.
 A series of sports cars run by BMW Motorsport known as the V12 LM and V12 LMR.